is a station on the Tokyo Kyuko Electric Railway Oimachi Line in southeast Tokyo, Japan.

Station layout

History
July 6, 1927 Opened.

Bus services
 bus stop
Tokyu Bus
<蒲15>Kamata Sta. - Ikegami Sta. - Ota Cultural Forest - Manpuku Temple mae - Ebaramachi Station Entrance
<森02>Omori Garage - Ota Cultural Forest - Manpuku Temple mae - Ebaramachi Station Entrance

References

Railway stations in Tokyo
Railway stations in Japan opened in 1927
Tokyu Oimachi Line
Stations of Tokyu Corporation